Thiruvarutprakasa Vallalār Chidambaram Ramalingam (5 October 1823 – 30 January 1874), commonly known in India and across the world as Vallalār, Ramalinga Swamigal and Ramalinga Adigal, was one of the most famous Tamil Saints and also one of the greatest Tamil poets of the 19th century and belongs to a line of Tamil saints known as "gnana siddhars" (gnana means higher wisdom).

The Samarasa Suddha Sanmarga Sathiya Sangam was spread and passed on by him not only in theory but mainly in practice by his own way of living which by itself is an inspiration for his followers. Through the notion of Suddha Sanmarga Sangam, the saint endeavored to eliminate the caste system. According to Suddha Sanmarga, the prime aspects of human life should be love connected with charity and divine practice leading to achievement of pure knowledge.

Ramalinga advocated the concept of worshipping the flame of a lighted lamp as a symbol of the eternal power.

Early life
Rāmalingam's parents were Rāmayyā Pillai and Chinnammai of Seer Karuneegar caste. She was his sixth wife, as all his previous wives had died childless and in quick succession. They were a family in Marudhur, a village in the old South Arcot district, near Chidambaram. Rāmalingam was their fifth child. The older ones were two sons Sabhapati and Parasu Rāman; and two daughters, Sundarammal and Unnamulai. They named their youngest child Rāmalingam.

Childhood and divine experiences
Once, Rāmalingam's parents went to the Chidambaram Natarājar Temple with their five month old child, and the infant was joyous while the priest was offering Deepa Aradhana (adoration by lighted lamp being brought close to the vigrahams); this was perceived by Rāmalingam as a deep spiritual experience. In later years he said of the experience: "No sooner the Light was perceived, happiness prevailed on me", and  "The sweet nectar was tasted by me as soon as the Arut perun jothi (Supreme Grace Of Light) became visible".

In 1824, his father Rāmayyā pillai died. Because of his untimely demise, Chinnammai shifted her residence to her mother's place at Chinna kāvanam, Ponneri. Saint Rāmalingam was a small child when he relocated with his mother to Chennai in 1826. He and his mother lived with his eldest brother Sabhapati and his wife Pāppāthi at 31/14 Veerasamy Pillai Street at Sevenwells area of Chennai, which is in the area near Chennai Kandha kottam Kandha swāmi temple. After Rāmalingam reached five years of age, Sabhapati initiated his formal education. But the young child was not interested in that, instead he preferred trips to the nearby Kandha swāmi temple. Sabhapati thought that the child needed punishment as a form of discipline, and he told his wife not to give Rāmalingam his daily meal. His kind sister-in-law, however, secretly gave him food and persuaded him to study seriously at home. In return, Rāmalingam asked for his own room, lighted lamp and mirror. He placed the light in front of the mirror. He started meditation by concentrating on the light and thus began the young boy's spiritual life. He miraculously saw a vision of the Lord Muruga. Rāmalingam said:

"The beauty endowed divine faces six, the illustrious shoulders twelve."

At one time, Rāmalingam had to replace his elder brother Sabhapati at an Upanyāsam (religious stories) session as upāsakar. His great discourse on verses from the `Periya Purānam', an epic poem by Sekkizhar about the saintly '63 Nāyanārs', was appreciated by the devotees as being given by a very learned scholar. Rāmalingam's mental and spiritual growth progressed rapidly. Rāmalingam says thanks to the Divine by:

"Effulgent flame of grace, that lit in me intelligence, to know untaught."

Rāmalingam evolved in his spiritual journey from being a devout devotee of Lord Shiva to worshiping the formless.

Rāmalingam renounced the world at the young age of thirteen but he was forced to marry his niece (on his sister's side). Legends say that the bridegroom during his first night after marriage was reading devotional works like the Thiruvāsagam. He was not interested in money, and it is said that in later life he reduced or ignored eating and sleeping. But he seemed fit in body, which was believed to be due to his supposed "physical transformation".

Teachings

Rāmalingam left Chennai in the year 1858. First he went to Chidambaram where he had a debate with Kodakanallur Sundara Swāmigal. At the request of one Rāmakrishna Reddiyar he went to his house at Karunguzhi (near Vadalur) and stayed there for nine years. He was very much against the caste system because of the adverse impacts it had on society. Towards that end, he started the "Samarasa Vedha Sanmarga Sangam" in 1865. In 1872 it was renamed "Samarasa Suddha Sanmarga Sathya Sangam", meaning "Society for pure truth in universal self-hood".

Rāmalingam was influenced by Valluvar and was drawn towards the teachings of the Tirukkural from a young age. He soon started teaching the Kural's message by conducting regular Kural classes to the masses. He vowed to follow the Kural's morals of compassion and non-violence and continued emphasizing on non-killing and meatless way of life throughout his life by his well-known concept of Jeeva Karunyam. Staunchly shunning non-vegetarianism, he said:When I see men feeding on the coarse and vicious food of meat, it is an ever-recurring grief to me.

In 1867, Rāmalingam established a facility named "The Sathya Dharma Salai" in Vadalur for serving free food to the poor. On the inaugural day he lit the fire of the stone stove, with a declaration that the fire be ever alive and the needy shall be fed forever. The facility, still in existence and run by volunteers, continues to serve free food to all people, without any caste distinction. The land for the facility was donated by kind, generous people and the registration documents are available for seeing by the visitors.
On 25 January 1872, Rāmalingam opened the "Sathya Gnana Sabha" (Hall of True Knowledge) at Vadalur. One of the primary teachings of Valallar is "Service to Living Beings is the path of Liberation/ Moksha". He declared that death is not natural that our life's first priority should be to fight death. He declared religion in itself a darkness. He laid great emphasis on adhering to vegetarianism. He said God is "Arul Perum Jothi" who is personification of Grace or mercy and knowledge. He said the path of compassion and mercy are the only path to God.

Around 1872 he established the "Sathya Gnana Sabai", hall of True Wisdom Forum and ensuring it was entirely secular. This place is not a temple; fruits, flowers are not offered, and no blessings are given. It was open to people of all castes except those who ate meat, who were only allowed to worship from the outside. He wrote in detail about the pooja to be performed in Gnāna sabai. Those who are below 12 years or those who are above 72 years alone were expected to enter Gnāna sabai and do poojas. The oil lamp lit by him is kept perpetually burning. He said that souls are blinded by seven veils.
 
There are seven cotton fabric screens, representing the seven factors that prevent a soul from realizing its true nature. The entire complex is bound by a chain with 21,600 links, said to represent 21,600 inhalations by a normal human being. He said the intelligence we possess is Maya intelligence which is not true and final intelligence. The path of final intelligence is Jeeva Karunyam. He advocated a casteless society. Vallalār was opposed to superstitions and rituals. He forbade killing animals even for the sake of food. He advocated feeding the poor as the highest form of worship. He condemned inequality based on birth. Today there are spiritual groups spread out all over the world who practice the teachings of Rāmalingam and follow the path of Arul Perum Jothi.

Chennai Kandha Kottam 
Kandha kottam Kandaswāmi Temple is located in the Parry's Corner neighbourhood of Chennai city. Rāmalingam and his mother lived with his eldest brother Sabhapati and his wife Pāppāthi at 31/14 Veerasamy Pillai Street at Sevenwells area of Chennai, which is in the area near Chennai Kandha kottam Kandha swāmi temple. He spent a lot of his time at this temple. Rāmalingam composed 'Deiva mani malai' here. At this temple, there is a hall called the Mukha mandapam, where the idols of Sarva Siddhi Vinayakar, Meenakshi Sundareswarar, Idumban, Sri Rāmalinga swāmigal, and Pamban swāmigal are found. The locality where he lived, has been renamed as 'Vallalār nagar'.

Literary works
As a musician and poet, he composed 5818 poems teaching universal love and peace, compiled into 'Six Thiru Muraigal', which are all available today as a single book called Thiruvarutpa (tiru-arut-pa, holy book of grace).

Another work of his is the Manumurai Kanda Vāsagam, describing the life of Manu Needhi Cholan, and Jeeva Karunya Ozhukkam, a work emphasizing compassion towards all sentient forms and insisting on a plants-only diet.

Songs set to music
 Thiruvarutpa songs of Rāmalinga swāmigal are sung in concerts and now at least 25 songs (in Thiru varut pā Isai Mālai) are given with swara-tāla notation.
 Thāyāgi thandhaiyumai (Hamsadhwani), Idu nalla tharunam (Shankarābharanam)
 Varuvar azhaithu vadi (Begada) and Thaen ena inikkum.

Some of his songs were set to music by Sīrkāzhi Govindharājan.

Disappearance

On 22 October 1873, Rāmalingam raised the flag of Brotherhood on his one-room residence Siddhi Valāgam in Mettukuppam. He gave his final and most popular lecture, about spiritual progress and, "nature of the powers that lie beyond us and move us," and recommended meditation using the lighted lamp from his room, which he then kept outside.

On 30 January 1874, Rāmalingam entered the room, locked himself inside and told his followers not to open it. After opening, he said, he will not be found there. (He will be "United with Nature & ruling the actions of 'all of the alls'," as told in his poem called 'Gnana Sariyai'). His seclusion spurred many rumors, and the Government finally forced the doors open in May. The room was empty, with no clues. In 1906, records about his disappearance were published in the South Arcot District's Madras District Gazetteers.

Postage stamp
The then chief minister of Tamil Nadu M. Karunanidhi released postage stamps depicting Rāmalingam on 17 August 2007. After that writ petition was submitted against the portrayal of Rāmalingam with ‘Thiru neeru’ (sacred ash) on his forehead. But the Madras High Court has declined to entertain that writ petition.

In popular culture
Two biographical films were made about Ramalinga Swamigal.

See also
 Jothi Agaval
 Arutperunjothi (1971 film)
 Jothi (1939 film)
 List of people who disappeared

References

Further reading
 Annamalai University's complete compilation of Thiruvarutpa in all six thirumurai in 10 Volumes Third edition of Thiruvarutpa released
 Srilata Rāman. "The Spaces In Between: Rāmalinga swāmigal (1823-1874), Hunger, and Religion in Colonial India," History of Religions (August 2013) 53#1 pp 1–27. DOI: 10.1086/671248
 Arut Prakasa Vallalār, the Saint of Universal Vision by V.S. Krishnan, published by Rāmanandha Adigalar Foundation, Coimbatore 641006
 Richard S. Weiss. 2019. The Emergence of Modern Hinduism: Religion on the Margins of Colonialism. California: University of California Press.

External links

 Vallalar.org, Vallalār website.
 Vallalar.co.in, For the followers of Sanmargam, the news about Vallalar guiding them in their superconscious dreams and the coming of Lord ArutPerumJothi andavar to planet earth.
 Vallalar_Babaji, Link between two Immortal Saint's Vallalar & Maha Avatar Babaji since 1952.
 Thiruarutpa.org, Online Thiruarutpa.
 Vallalar.org, Vallalār website.
 atruegod.org, Suddha Sanmarga by Vallalār, website.
 Vallalar.in,  Vallalār biography websites.
 Vallalarspace.com, All Sanmarga sanga websites.
 Vallalarspace.org, Vallalar Groups.
 Vallalarkudanthai.com, Thiru Arutpa Literary & Musical Association. Kumbakonam.

1823 births
1870s missing person cases
1874 deaths
19th-century Hindu religious leaders
Missing person cases in India
People from Cuddalore district
Spiritual teachers
Tamil poets
Year of death unknown
Anti-caste activists
Indian social reformers
Hindu reformers